Albert Kenneth Corley (May 10, 1920June 27, 1984) was an American professional basketball player. He played for the Cleveland Rebels of the Basketball Association of America (now known as the National Basketball Association). Many encyclopedias state he is the brother of former NBA player Ray Corley, but Ray was born and raised near New York City whereas Ken grew up in Eldorado, Oklahoma.

Early life and education
Ken played college basketball and football at University of Central Oklahoma (then known as Central State College). During World War II, Corley served in the navy achieving the rank of chief specialist. He served at United States Naval Training Center Bainbridge and Philadelphia Naval Shipyard.

Professional career
After serving in the U.S. Navy, Ken played two seasons for the Wilmington Bombers in the American Basketball League. He also played in three games for the Cleveland Rebels. Corley also briefly played minor league baseball.

BAA career statistics

Regular season

References

External links
 
 

1920 births
1984 deaths
American men's basketball players
Centers (basketball)
Central Oklahoma Bronchos football players
Central Oklahoma Bronchos men's basketball players
Cleveland Rebels players
United States Navy sailors
United States Navy personnel of World War II